Infantry Attacks is a classic book on military tactics written by Erwin Rommel about his experiences in World War I. At the time of the book's writing in the mid-1930s, Rommel's rank was lieutenant colonel. Rommel had planned to write a successor called  (in English: Tank Attacks) about tank warfare, and gathered much material during the North Africa Campaign. However, as a result of his perceived involvement in a failed assassination attempt of Adolf Hitler, he was forced to commit suicide before completing this work.

Overview
Rommel describes his Stoßtruppen (shock troops) tactics, which used speed, deception, and deep penetration into enemy territory to surprise and overwhelm. Throughout the book, Rommel reports assigning small numbers of men to approach enemy lines from the direction in which attack was expected. The men would yell, throw hand grenades and otherwise simulate the anticipated attack from concealment, while attack squads and larger bodies of men sneaked to the flanks and rears of the defenders to take them by surprise. These tactics often intimidated enemies into surrendering, thus avoiding unnecessary exertion, expenditure of ammunition, and risk of injury.

Contents
The text is divided into six chapters:
I. Movement War 1914 in Belgium and Northern France
II. Fights in the Argonne 1915
III. Position war in the  High Vosges 1916, movement war in Romania 1916/1917
IV. Fights in the Southeastern Carpathians, August 1917
V. Attacking battle at Tolmein 1917 
VI. Pursuit of Tagliamento and Piave

Translations
In 1943, an abridged version titled, more simply, Attacks! was released by the US military for officers' tactical study. The first full English translation was published in 1944 by The Infantry Journal in the United States.  The translator was Lieutenant Colonel Gustave E. Kidde without permission from Rommel, according to the foreword to the 1995 edition published by Stackpole Books.

Impact
Infanterie greift an was first published in 1937 and helped to persuade Adolf Hitler to give Rommel high command in World War II, although he was not from an old military family or the Prussian aristocracy, which had traditionally dominated the German officer corps. It was printed in Germany until 1945. By then, about 500,000 copies had been published. The book is still in print, and was most recently published in German in 2015. 

The book was also used throughout the West as a resource for infantry tactical movements. General George S. Patton was among the many influential military leaders reported to have read Infantry Attacks.

In popular culture
In the 1970 film Patton, when it is clear to Patton that he is defeating forces he believes are commanded by Rommel during a tank battle, Patton says to himself, "Rommel, you magnificent bastard, I read your book!" However, in a previous scene in the film, Patton is awoken by his aides with news that an intercepted German radio message reveals that Rommel will attack Patton near El Guettar, Tunisia. Before this, the camera focuses on a book on Patton's nightstand, The Tank in Attack (Panzer greift an), a book which Rommel had planned to write but never completed.

Notes

1937 non-fiction books
German-language books
Infantry
History books about World War I
Military strategy books
Personal accounts of World War I
Erwin Rommel